The Best of Tanita Tikaram is the first compilation by pop singer Tanita Tikaram, released in 1996 by East West Records. Containing fifteen songs from 1988 to 1995, it also included one new track "And I Think of You - E penso a te" which was released as a promotional single and a special remix of her biggest hit "Twist in My Sobriety" which was also released as a single in UK.

Track listing 
"Twist in My Sobriety" (1988)
"Cathedral Song" (1988)
"World Outside Your Window" (1988)
"Good Tradition" (1988)
"Love Don't Need No Tyranny" (1992)
"Little Sister Leaving Town" (1990)
"Only The Ones We Love" (1991)
"You Make the Whole World Cry" (1992)
"Trouble" (1992)
"Wonderful Shadow" (1995)
"Men & Women" (1992)
"I Might Be Crying" (1994)
"Happy Taxi" (1994)
"My Love Tonight" (1994)
"Lovers in the City" (1994)
"And I Think of You - E penso a te" (1996)
"Twist in My Sobriety" (Tikaramp radio) (1996)

Personnel
Engineer – Simon Hurrell (tracks: 1 2 3 4 5 6 7 8 9 17)
Engineer – John Hudson (tracks: 14), Steve Krause (tracks: 11), Steve Price (tracks: 10 12 13 15)
Liner notes – Alan Jackson
Mixed by – Mark (tracks: 5 8 9), Nic (tracks: 5 8 9), Peter (tracks: 1 2 3 4 6 7), Rod (tracks: 1 2 3 4 6 7), Simon* (tracks: 1 2 3 4 5 6 7 8 9)
Producer – Peter Van Hooke (tracks: 1 2 3 4 6 7 17), The Rapino Brothers (tracks: 16), Rod Argent (tracks: 1 2 3 4 6 7 17), Tanita Tikaram (tracks: 5 7 8 9 10 11 12 14), Thomas Newman (tracks: 13 15)
Written by – Battisti (tracks: 16), Mogol (tracks: 16), Tanita Tikaram (tracks: 1 2 3 4 5 6 7 8 9 10 11 12 13 14 15 17)

Notes
Short biography written by Alan Jackson, The Times, May 1996. 
(P) Tracks 1-4 1988, track 6 1990, track 7 1991 WEA Records Ltd., tracks 5,8,9,11 1992, track 10 1995, tracks 12-15 1994 WMUK Ltd., tracks 16,17 1996 Warner Music UK Ltd. 
Made in Germany by Warner Music Europe. 
Tracks 1-16 are album versions, tracks 16 & 17 previously unreleased. 
Durations do not appear on the release.

References

1996 compilation albums
Tanita Tikaram albums
Albums produced by Rod Argent
Albums produced by Peter Van Hooke
East West Records compilation albums